Kana language may refer to:

Khana language (also known as Ogoni proper), the prestige variety of the Ogoni languages in Nigeria.
Kana dialect (also known as Leyteño), a dialect of the Cebuano language of the Central Philippines.

See also

Kana, one of the scripts used for writing Japanese